The 1967 Ice Hockey World Championships was the 34th edition of the Ice Hockey World Championships. The tournament was held in Vienna, Austria from March 18 to March 29, 1967. The Soviet Union won the tournament for the fifth straight year, Sweden won the silver medal, and Canada claimed the bronze medal.

Host selection
Bids to host the event were received from the Austrian Ice Hockey Association and the Canadian Amateur Hockey Association (CAHA) in March 1965. The International Ice Hockey Federation (IIHF) voted to host the event in Austria. Canada had bid hoping to combine the event with the Canadian Centennial. CAHA second vice-president Lloyd Pollock reacted by saying, "possibly we should consider now whether or not its worth" going to future championships, in a comment that foreshadowed Canada's eventual withdrawal from the world championships in 1970.

Summary
For the fifth straight year, the Soviet Union won the tournament.  They won all their games claiming their seventh World championship, and eleventh European.  The competition for the other medals was very close, with Sweden, Canada, and Czechoslovakia all being in contention until the end.  Sweden defeated Canada on the final day to clinch a medal and claimed Silver when the Czechs lost to the Soviets in the final game.  Canada claimed Bronze, losing out to Sweden on the head-to-head tie-breaker.  The East Germans handily defeated the West this year, which was believed to have settled who would be relegated.  However, starting in 1969, the top tier shrank to only six nations meaning that both German entries ended up being relegated.  The tournament also featured an historic first, when Finland defeated Czechoslovakia.

In Group 'B' the championship was settled on the final day.  With one game to play, both Romania and Poland had ten points, both had a goal differential of +14, and they had tied each other, so whoever won their final game by a wider margin would claim tournament victory.  The Romanians defeated Yugoslavia five to three, and then had to watch as the Poles defeated Austria seven to two.  The Polish team were quite fortunate that Romania had blown a lead on the second last day against Austria, but were very unfortunate that the change in the top tier format allowed for no promotion from Group 'B'  Oddly, the leading scorer (Zoltán Horváth) came from the last placed team, Hungary.  Japan won all four of their games by wide margins to claim Group 'C' but had to wait (like Poland) until 1969 for another chance to move up.

World Championship Group A (Austria)

Final Round 

Both East and West Germany were relegated as the top tier shrank to six nations for 1969.

World Championship Group B (Austria)

Final Round 

Both Switzerland and Hungary were relegated to the 'C' pool for 1969, additionally they missed qualifying for the 1968 Olympics.  No one was promoted.

World Championship Group C (Austria)

Final Round 

With the top level shrinking, no one was promoted but Japan earned a trip to the Grenoble Olympics.  Belgium, Great Britain, and North Korea were expected to play in this tournament, but did not participate.

Ranking and statistics

Tournament Awards
Best players selected by the directorate:
Best Goaltender:       Carl Wetzel
Best Defenceman:       Vitaly Davydov
Best Forward:          Anatoli Firsov
Media All-Star Team:
Goaltender:  Carl Wetzel
Defence:  Carl Brewer,  Alexander Ragulin
Forwards:  Veniamin Alexandrov,  Alexander Almetov,  Anatoli Firsov

Final standings
The final standings of the tournament according to IIHF:

European championships final standings
The final standings of the European championships according to IIHF:

Citations

References

Summary (in french)

 

IIHF Men's World Ice Hockey Championships
World Championships
International ice hockey competitions hosted by Austria
March 1967 sports events in Europe
Sports competitions in Vienna
1960s in Vienna